Iochroma is a genus of about 34 species of shrubs and small trees belonging to the nightshade family Solanaceae. Species are native from Mexico to south Brazil. They are found in the forests of Mexico and South America. Their hummingbird-pollinated flowers are tubular or trumpet-shaped, and may be blue, purple, red, yellow, or white, becoming pulpy berries. The cupular (cup-shaped) calyx is inflated in some species. The leaves are alternate, simple, and entire.

Iochromas are cultivated as flowering ornamentals and in cooler zones (zones 7–8/9) make useful patio shrubs for summer display or conservatory plants. The majority are not frost-hardy and must be overwintered under protection. In warmer zones (zones 9–10) they can be used as landscape plants. They are commonly trained as standards (topiary) to control their size and shape. Iochroma flowers attract hummingbirds (Americas only) and bees to gardens.

Like many plants in the Solanaceae, Iochroma species contain phytochemicals with potential pharmaceutical value but the genus has not been exhaustively studied in this respect. Iochroma fuchsioides is taken by the medicine men of the Kamsa Indians of the Sibundoy valley in the Colombian Andes for difficult diagnoses, the unpleasant side effects lasting several days. A variety of withanolides  and hydroxycinnamic acid amides  have been isolated from Iochroma species.

Taxonomy
The genus Iochroma was established by George Bentham in 1845. Like other plant families, the Solanaceae is divided further into subfamilies, tribes and subtribes. Iochroma is in the subtribe Iochrominae along with the genera Dunalia, Eriolarynx, Saracha and Vassobia.  , Acnistus, previously treated as a separate genus, was regarded as a synonym of Iochroma.

Species

The genus is currently divided into three sections. , Plants of the World Online accepts the following species:

Section Iochroma
Iochroma albianthum S.Leiva
Iochroma ayabacense S.Leiva
Iochroma calycinum Benth.
Iochroma confertiflorum (Miers) Hunz.
Iochroma cornifolium (Kunth) Miers
Iochroma cyaneum (Lindl.) M.L.Green
Iochroma edule S.Leiva
Iochroma fuchsioides (Bonpl.) Miers
Iochroma gesnerioides (Kunth) Miers
Iochroma loxense Miers
Iochroma nitidum S.Leiva & Quip.
Iochroma peruvianum (Dunal) J.F.Macbr.
Iochroma piuranum S.Leiva
Iochroma salpoanum S.Leiva & Lezama
Iochroma schjellerupii S.Leiva & Quip.
Iochroma squamosum S.Leiva & Quip.
Iochroma stenanthum S.Leiva, Quip. & N.W.Sawyer
Iochroma tingoanum S.Leiva
Iochroma tupayachianum S.Leiva

Section Lehmannia
Iochroma ellipticum (Hook.f.) Hunz.
Iochroma lehmannii Bitter

Section Spinosa
Iochroma parvifolium (Roem. & Schult.) D'Arcy

Unclassified
Iochroma amicorum M.A.Cueva, S.D.Sm. & S.Leiva
Iochroma arborescens (L.) J.M.H.Shaw
Iochroma barbozae S.Leiva & Deanna
Iochroma baumii S.D.Sm. & S.Leiva
Iochroma brevistamineum Dammer
Iochroma cachicadanum S.Leiva
Iochroma lilacinum S.Leiva & K.Lezama
Iochroma longipes Miers
Iochroma lyciifolium Dammer
Iochroma mionei S.Leiva & S.D.Sm.
Iochroma ortizianthum S.Leiva & Deanna
Iochroma richardianthum S.Leiva
Iochroma rubicalyx S.Leiva & Jara
Iochroma smithianum K.Lezama, Limo & S.Leiva
Iochroma solanifolium Dammer
Iochroma viridescens S.Leiva
Iochroma warscewiczii Regel

Former species
Species formerly placed in the genus Iochroma include:
Iochroma australe Griseb. (Bolivia, Argentina) → Eriolarynx australis
Iochroma cardenasianum Hunz. → Trompettia cardenasiana
Iochroma grandiflorum Benth. → Trozelia grandiflora
Iochroma umbellatum (Ruiz & Pav.) Hunz. → Trozelia umbellata

Cultivation
Several forms of Iochroma (some wild collected, some garden hybrids) have been given cultivar names. Some of the cultivars have been assigned to species but others, mainly hybrids, have not. There may be some synonymy in this list.

 Iochroma calycinum 'Vlasta’s Surprise'
 Iochroma cyaneum 'Album'
 Iochroma cyaneum 'Apricot Belle'
 Iochroma cyaneum 'Indigo'
 Iochroma cyaneum 'Karl Hartweg'
 Iochroma cyaneum 'John Miers'
 Iochroma cyaneum 'Royal Blue'
 Iochroma cyaneum 'Royal Queen' = I. cyaneum 'Indigo'
 Iochroma cyaneum 'Sky King'
 Iochroma cyaneum 'Trebah'
 Iochroma cyaneum 'Woodcote White'
 Iochroma gesnerioides 'Coccineum'
 Iochroma gesnerioides var. flavum
 Iochroma 'Ashcott Red'
 Iochroma 'Burgundy Bells'
 Iochroma 'Frosty Plum'
 Iochroma 'Ilie’s Plum'
 Iochroma 'Plum Beauty'
 Iochroma 'Plum Delight'
 Iochroma 'Purple Haze'
 Iochroma 'Ruby Red'  (I. cyaneum 'Royal Blue' x I. 'Sunset')
 Iochroma 'Sunset'
 Iochroma 'Wine Red'

References

External links 
 (2008): Iochroma - an annotated list of the species and cultivars 

 
Solanaceae genera
Garden plants of South America